Jeppe Borild Kjær (born 6 November 1985) is a retired Danish footballer.

Career
After leaving Lyngby BK on 25 June 2019, he joined FC Helsingør on 9 July 2019 on a 2-year contract.

References

Danish men's footballers
Danish Superliga players
Danish 1st Division players
1985 births
Living people
People from Roskilde
FC Roskilde players
HB Køge players
Aarhus Gymnastikforening players
Lyngby Boldklub players
FC Helsingør players
Association football forwards
Sportspeople from Region Zealand